A moy was a measure for salt, used in British colonial North America. It amounted to about 15 bushels. It likely derives from the Portuguese moio and the trade in salt between North America and the Azores. Alternatively, the term may have come from the Scots, moy - a certain measure.

Citations

References
 

Units of volume
Edible salt
Obsolete units of measurement